Anna of Saxony (16 November 1567 - 27 January 1613), was a Duchess of Saxe-Coburg-Eisenach by marriage to John Casimir, Duke of Saxe-Coburg-Eisenach.

Life
Born in Dresden, she was the twelfth of fifteen children born from the first marriage of Augustus, Elector of Saxony and Anna, Princess of Denmark. 

On 4 May 1584 and without the consent of her father, Anna became engaged to John Casimir, Duke of Saxe-Coburg-Eisenach. The marriage finally took place in Dresden on 16 January 1586, and she received 30,000 Thalers as a dowry, as well as the city of Römhild as her Wittum (Dower land). The cheerful and high-spirited Duchess soon produced magnificent festivities in her new court.

However, the marriage soon failed: John Casimir preferred hunting to marital life. By the end of September 1593, the Duchess was caught in adultery by her husband. John Casimir immediately ordered the arrest of Anna and her lover, Ulrich of Lichtenstein. Despite the letters which Anna wrote to her husband and her relatives asking for mercy, on 12 December the Schöppenstuhl (High Court Chamber) in Jena formally annulled her marriage and sentenced both lovers to beheading by sword. In the case of John Casimir,the death sentence was commuted, suddenly, to life imprisonment. 

Anna was sent firstly to Eisenach, then to Kahlenberg Castle, in 1596 to the former Sonnefeld Monastery and finally (1603) to the Veste Coburg, where she died in 1613, aged 45. She was buried in the Klosterkirche, Sonnefeld. Ulrich of Lichtenstein died in prison twenty years later, on 8 December 1633, just three days after being granted his freedom.

In 1599 John Casimir contracted a second marriage with Anna's maternal first-cousin Margaret of Brunswick-Lüneburg; to humiliated his first wife, he celebrated this occasion with the famous Coburg Taler: on the obverse showed a kissing couple with the inscription WIE KVSSEN SICH DIE ZWEY SO FEIN (A well kiss between two), while on the reverse, showed Anna dressed as a nun with the inscription:  WER KVST MICH - ARMES NVNNELIN (who kiss you now, poor nun?).

Notes

References
August Beck: Anna In: Allgemeine Deutsche Biographie (ADB), vol. 1, Duncker & Humblot, Leipzig 1875, p. 471.
Thomas Nicklas: Das Haus Sachsen-Coburg – Europas späte Dynastie, Kohlhammer Verlag, Stuttgart 2003.
Carl Kiesewetter: Faust in der Geschichte und Tradition, Georg Olms Editorial, 1978.
M. Berbig: Anna von Sachsen, erste Gemahlin Johann Casimirs von Coburg-Gotha.
Eduard Vehse: Geschichte der Höfe des Hauses Sachsen, Hamburg 1854, p. 14.
Ludwig Bechstein: Thüringer Sagenbuch, p. 17.
Anne-Simone Knöfel: Anna von Sachsen, in: Sächsische Biografie, published by the Institut für Sächsische Geschichte und Volkskunde, ed. by Martina Schattkowsky.
Hans-Joachim Böttcher: WENIG UND BÖS WAR DIE ZEIT MEINES LEBENS - Anna von Sachsen (1567-1613), Dresden 2016, .

|-

House of Wettin
1567 births
1593 deaths
Nobility from Dresden
Albertine branch
Daughters of monarchs